WBGR may refer to:

 WBGR-FM, a radio station (93.7 FM) licensed to serve Monroe, Wisconsin, United States
 WBGR-LD, a low-power television station (channel 33) licensed to Bangor/Dedham, Maine, United States
 WFSI, a radio station (860 AM) licensed to Baltimore, Maryland, United States, which used the call sign WBGR until 2011
 WLZL, a radio station (107.9 FM) licensed to Annapolis, Maryland, which used the call sign WBGR in December 2011
 the ICAO code for Miri Airport